The Lilly B is a ferry owned by Bustins Island, Maine, United States. It runs several times daily between South Freeport and Bustins Island from Memorial Day to Columbus Day. It is named for Lilly May Brewer (1906–1977), who, along with her husband Ralph (1900–1968), was the caretaker of Bustins during the 1950s and 1960s.

It was designed by naval architect Al Spalding and built by Bradley Simmons. Its maiden voyage took place on April 22, 2000.

The ferry has a capacity of 44 passengers, and it is not permitted to carry propane or gasoline as baggage.

The ferry is staffed largely by islanders, and its passengers are almost all its residents. As of 2022, its captain is Painter Soule, who was formerly a member of the crew.

References 

Ferries of Maine
Freeport, Maine